The 2007 PGA Championship was the 89th PGA Championship, played August 9–12 at Southern Hills Country Club in Tulsa, Oklahoma. Defending champion Tiger Woods won his fourth PGA Championship and 13th major title, two strokes ahead of runner-up Woody Austin.

Venue
Similar to the upgrades it received prior to the 2001 U.S. Open, Southern Hills underwent extensive renovations to prepare for the 2007 PGA Championship, including new greens and renovated bunkers, as well as an upgrade to the clubhouse. A major heatwave gripping the United States impacted playing conditions significantly.  The high temperature for the four days of the tournament reached 101, 99, 99, and 102.  Joking about the heat after hooking one of his drives into the trees, Colin Montgomerie said "at least it's in the shade".

It was the seventh major championship and fourth PGA Championship at Southern Hills; the three previous winners were Dave Stockton (1970), Raymond Floyd (1982) and Nick Price (1994). The U.S. Open winners were Tommy Bolt (1958), Hubert Green (1977),  and Retief Goosen (2001).

Course layout

Lengths of the course in previous major championships:
, par 70 - 2001 U.S. Open
, par 70 - 1994 PGA Championship
, par 70 - 1982 PGA Championship
, par 70 - 1977 U.S. Open
, par 70 - 1970 PGA Championship
, par 70 - 1958 U.S. Open

Field
All former PGA Champions
The last five U.S. Open Champions (2003 through 2007)
The last five Masters Champions (2003 through 2007)
The last five Open Champions (2003 through 2007)
Current PGA Seniors' Champion (2007)
The 15 low scorers and ties in the 2006 PGA Championship 
The 20 low scorers in the 2007 PGA Professional National Championship (formerly CPC) 
The 70 leaders in official money standings from the 2006 International through the 2007 Canadian Open 
Members of the 2006 United States Ryder Cup team
Winners of tournaments co-sponsored or approved by the PGA Tour from the 2006 PGA Championship to the 2007 PGA Championship (does not include Pro-Am and Team competitions).
In addition, the PGA reserves the right to invite additional players not included in the categories listed above.
The 156-player field will be filled (in order) by those players below 70th place in official money standings (#8 above).

Past champions in the field

Made the cut

Missed the cut

Round summaries

First round
Thursday, August 9, 2007

Graeme Storm led the field after the first round by shooting a bogey-free 65 (−5). Storm is playing in his first PGA Championship. Defending champion Tiger Woods began his campaign for his 13th major victory by shooting a 71 (+1). Other notable scores include: John Daly, currently ranked 423rd in the world, shooting a 67 (−3); Brad Lardon shot the best round of the day among those who qualified for the tournament through the PGA Professional National Championship by shooting an even-par 70; U.S. Open champion Ángel Cabrera shot a disappointing 81 (+11), largely due to a septuple-bogey 10 on the par 3 6th hole; Retief Goosen, the last major champion at Southern Hills (2001 U.S. Open), shot an even-par 70 including an eagle and a double-bogey. The scoring average for the round was 74.29 (+4.29) with 12 players under par. The par 4 18th hole ranked the toughest with a scoring average of 4.49 (+0.49). The par 3 11th hole was the easiest of the day with a scoring average of 2.97 (−0.03), the only hole that played under par.

Second round
Friday, August 10, 2007

Tiger Woods scored a 63, tying the record for the lowest single-round score at a major championship. The feat had been previously accomplished 22 times by 20 other players, and also tied the course record set by Raymond Floyd in the 1982 PGA Championship.  His birdie putt on the 18th hole for the record outright horseshoed around the cup but did not fall.  Local fan favorite and former Oklahoma State golfer Scott Verplank also had a good round with a score of 66. The cut was at 145 (+5) and 72 players advanced. Only two PGA club professionals made the cut. Jim Furyk and Vijay Singh were among those who missed the cut. The scoring average for the round was 72.80 (+2.80) with 24 players under par for the round.

Third round
Saturday, August 11, 2007

Tiger Woods stretched his lead to three strokes, and has held at least a share of the 54-hole lead in a major 13 times. He was in the final group of three out of the four major championships in 2007. Boo Weekley shot the low round of the day, a five-under par 65. Sergio García was disqualified after the third round for signing an incorrect scorecard. Had he signed it correctly, he would have been at 219 (+9) in a tie for 63rd place. The scoring average for the round was 71.92 (+1.92) with 15 players under par for the round.

Final round
Sunday, August 12, 2007

Tiger Woods claimed his fourth PGA Championship and improved to 13–0 in major championships when holding at least a share of the 54-hole lead. He led by as many as five strokes in the third and fourth rounds. However, his bogey on the 14th hole, coupled with Woody Austin's third consecutive birdie at the 13th, whittled Woods' lead down to a single stroke. Woods rebounded, however, with a birdie on the 15th hole, and then parred in to claim the championship.  Simon Dyson shot the low round of the day with a 64 (−6).  The scoring average for the round was 71.82 (+1.82) with 16 players under par for the round.

Scorecard

Cumulative tournament scores, relative to par

Source:

Television
Television coverage in the United States was provided by TNT and CBS.

References

External links
2007 PGA Championship official site
Coverage on European Tour's official site
Southern Hills Country Club official site

PGA Championship
Golf in Oklahoma
Sports in Tulsa, Oklahoma
PGA Championship
PGA Championship
August 2007 sports events in the United States